Akdağ is a Turkish surname. Notable people with the surname include:

 Recep Akdağ (born 1960), Turkish physician and politician
 Tarık Langat Akdağ (born 1988), Turkish long-distance runner
 Vehbi Akdağ, Turkish wrestler 

Turkish-language surnames